The Kyrgyz State Medical Academy (KSMA), known officially as the Kyrgyz State Medical Academy named after I.K. Akhunbaev is a medical school in Kyrgyzstan, located in Bishkek.

History 
It was opened on 1 September 1939 in the city of Frunze (now Bishkek) in the Kyrgyz SSR, with the recruitment of 200 students. The establishment of the institute was contributed to by the First Moscow Medical Institute, high medical schools of Saint-Petersburg, Almaty, Tashkent and other medical institutions.

Scientific research 
Central Research Laboratory
Scientific Student Society
Council of Young Scientists
Annual international conferences of students and young scientists

Student life 
Department of educational work:
 Golden Mean
 Annual Student Initiation
 Student festivals "Star hour" and "Spring - Bishkek"
 KVN team "DNA", "LCD"

For international students:
 Friendship evenings
 Russian language evening
 Study tours

Student Senate:
 Educational sector
 Research Sector
 Housing sector
 Law Enforcement Sector
 Sports and fitness sector
 Cultural work sector
 Information support sector

Faculties

Military Faculty 
The Military Faculty of Kyrgyz State Medical Academy was created in the beginning of the Second World War, specifically in October 1941 when there was a shortage of medical personnel in the medical service. Originally it was the Sanitary Department of Defence, and in 1942 it was renamed to the Department of Military and Health Training, and has since 1944 been known as the Department of Military Medical Training. It is currently part of the Armed Forces of the Kyrgyz Republic and engages in the military training of students of medical, pediatric, dental, sanitary and pharmaceutical departments of the armed forces.

Notable faculty 

 Mitalip Mamytov -  neurosurgeon and academic
 Kakish Ryskulova - first woman surgeon of Central Asian descent

References

Universities in Bishkek
1939 establishments in the Kirghiz Soviet Socialist Republic
Medical schools in Kyrgyzstan
Education in Bishkek